A spade is a digging and gardening tool.

Spade or Spades may also refer to:

Cards
Spades (card game), a trick-taking card game
Spades (suit), one of the four French suits commonly used in playing cards

Music
 The Spade, a 2011 studio album by Butch Walker
 "Spade", a song from The Golden Age of Grotesque by Marilyn Manson
 The Spades, first notable band of Roky Erickson

Places
Spades, Indiana, an unincorporated community
Spade Township, Knox County, Nebraska, United States
Spade, Texas, a census designated place
Spade Ranch (Nebraska), a cattle ranch
Spade Ranch (Texas), two ranches

Software
SPAdes (software), a set of tools for genomic sequence assembly
SMART Process Acceleration Development Environment

Other uses
Toyota Spade, a variant of the Toyota Porte mini multi-purpose vehicle
Spade, a character from Freedom Planet
Spade, an otter in Tarka the Otter
Spade, a form of ancient Chinese coinage
Spade, an aircraft aileron component
Spade, an ethnic slur for a black person

People with the name
Andy Spade, American entrepreneur, brother of David Spade
Bob Spade (1877–1924), American Major League Baseball pitcher
David Spade (born 1964), American comedian and actor
Dean Spade (born 1977), American lawyer, writer and academic
Doug Spade (born 1951), American politician
Dudley Spade (born 1956), American politician
Henri Spade (1921–2008), French journalist, television producer and novelist
Kate Spade (1962–2018), American designer, co-founder of Kate Spade New York
Mark Spade, pseudonym of Nigel Balchin (1908–1970), English psychologist, novelist and screenwriter
Sam Spade, a fictional detective 
Spade Cooley (1910–1969), American Western swing musician, big band leader, actor, and television personality, convicted of murdering his second wife

See also
Call a spade a spade, a figurative expression, meaning to speak plainly and bluntly
SPAD (disambiguation)
Spade House, home of writer H. G. Wells from 1901 to 1909
Spayed, past tense form of the verb "to spay"